Marian Roalfe Cox (1860–1916) was an English folklorist who pioneered studies in Morphology for the fairy tale Cinderella.

In 1893, after being commissioned by the Folklore Society of Britain, she produced Cinderella: Three Hundred and Forty-Five Variants of Cinderella, Catskin and, Cap O' Rushes, Abstracted and Tabulated with a Discussion of Medieval Analogues and Notes, a seminal work in the study of Cinderella, introduced by Andrew Lang.  Prior to anthologization and folklore indices, she identified five broad types:
A – Ill-treated heroine. Recognition by means of a shoe.  Among the examples included: Cinderella, Katie Woodencloak, Finette Cendron, The Sharp Grey Sheep, Fair, Brown and Trembling, Aschenputtel, Rushen Coatie, and The Wonderful Birch.  It corresponds to Aarne-Thompson type 510A.
 B – Unnatural father. Heroine flight. Among the examples included: Catskin, Donkeyskin, The King who Wished to Marry His Daughter, Allerleirauh. It corresponds to Aarne-Thompson type 510B.
C – King Lear judgment. Outcast heroine.  Among the examples included:  Cap O' Rushes, The Goose-Girl at the Well. Includes tales later classified as ATU 923, "Love Like Salt".
D – Indeterminate Among the examples included: One-Eye, Two-Eyes, and Three-Eyes (which she listed as approximating "Cinderella"), The Bear (which she listed as approximating "Catskin") and Tattercoats (which approximated neither)
E – Hero Tales (Masculine Cinderella.) Among the examples included: The Little Bull-Calf, The Glass Mountain.

She also wrote An Introduction to Folk-Lore.

References

Further reading
 Cox, Marian Roalfe. "Cinderella". In: Folklore 18:2 (1907). pp. 191–208. DOI: 10.1080/0015587X.1907.9719772

External links
 
 Text of Cinderella: Three Hundred and Forty-Five Variants of Cinderella, Catskin and, Cap O' Rushes, Abstracted and Tabulated with a Discussion of Medieval Analogues and Notes
Burne, Charlotte S. "Obituary: Marian Emily Roalfe Cox" Folk-Lore. Volume 27, 1916. pp. 434–435.

English folklorists
Women folklorists
1860 births
1916 deaths